Tepidimonas fonticaldi is a Gram-negative, thermophilic, motile bacterium with a single polar flagellum from the genus Tepidimonas, which was isolated from a hot spring water sample from the Antun hot spring in Taiwan.

References

External links
Type strain of Tepidimonas fonticaldi at BacDive -  the Bacterial Diversity Metadatabase

Comamonadaceae
Bacteria described in 2013